The University of Tunis El Manar (UTM) is a university located in Tunis, Tunisia. It was founded in 2000 and is organized in 11 Faculties.

Ranking
According to URAP (University Ranking by Academic Performance) ranking of 2019–2020, it is the best university in Tunisia and the 613th university in the world.

The CEO of this university is Jihed Hafsi.

Organization
These are the 11 faculties, schools and institute in which the university is divided into:

 Faculty of Law and Political Sciences
 Faculty of Medicine
 Faculty of Economic Sciences and Management
 Sciences' Faculty
 National Engineering School
 Bourguiba Institute of Modern Languages
 Preparatory Institute For Engineering Studies

Alumni

 Afwa Thameur - agronomist and specialist in drought tolerance in crops.

See also
 List of colleges and universities
 Tunis

References

External links
Tunis El Manar University Website 

 
2000 establishments in Tunisia
Educational institutions established in 2000
Education in Tunis
Members of the International Council for Science
Members of the International Science Council